Second home or Second Home may refer to:

 Dacha, a type of non-primary residence found in Russia and post-Soviet countries
 Holiday cottage, a non-primary residence owned for tourism reasons
 Vacation rental, a non-primary residence owned for vacation purposes
 Pied-à-terre, a non-primary residence generally found in urban centers
 Second Home, an album by Marié Digby
Second Home, a British-Founded coworking space with locations in London, Lisbon, and Los Angeles

See also
 Second Home Rule Bill, the Government of Ireland Bill 1893